Notre Dame College, Dhaka, also known as NDC, is a Catholic higher secondary school (in the Indian subcontinent, as in the United Kingdom, higher secondary schools comprising the 11th and 12th years of education are often referred to as colleges) as well as a degree college affiliated to the National University.

It is one of the oldest educational institutions in Dhaka, Bangladesh, established in 1949. This institution is administered by the Congregation of Holy Cross, Society of Priests. The college also offers three years of degree program, Bachelor of Arts (BA Pass Course) and Bachelor of Social Sciences (BSS Pass Course). In 2019, the institution celebrated its 70th anniversary.

History
Notre Dame College was first established at Luxmibazar, Old Dhaka in November, 1949 with the name "St. Gregory College". In 1954–55, the institution was transferred to Arambagh, Motijheel from its initial location of Dhaka with the present name – "Notre Dame", referring to Mary, the mother of Jesus Christ.

It was established by the Roman Catholic Priests from the Congregation of Holy Cross because of the crisis in the education sector of newborn East Pakistan. It was known as the St. Gregory College, an extension of the St. Gregory's School, which was also established by the mission.

It was relocated to its current location in Motijheel in 1954 and renamed to Notre Dame College. The new name was a tribute to the University of Notre Dame, the alma mater of many of the faculty members.

Since the 1980s, Notre Dame College gained reputation of the best institution for higher secondary education in the country. The highest number of perfect GPA holders in national examination (H.S.C.) and the exceptional success of its students in university admission tests bear testimony to this.

Architecture

Robert Boughey An American architect born in Pennsylvania, USA. He completed his Bachelor of Architecture from Pratt Institute, Brooklyn, New York in 1959 and received Diploma in Tropical Studies from AA School of Architecture, London in 1967. He is a former research professor of architecture at Pratt institute. He is the architect of the main structure of Notre Dame College.

Students
Students of Notre Dame College are known as "Notredamians". Every year Notre Dame College admits around 2000-2100 students in science, around 410 students in humanities and around 750 students in business studies group through one of the most competitive college admission process in the country.
Currently, it consists of 17 sections for students in science terming each as "Groups". In case of science, groups 1 to 14 include Bangla medium students and the rest 15, 16 and 17 groups admit English version students. Humanities has groups H, W and G while the business studies has groups A, B, C, D, E and F.

Extracurricular clubs
The college has 26 extracurricular clubs.

Notre Dame Nature Study Club
Notre Dame Nature Study Club also known as NDNSC, is the first nature club in the country. It was established on 29 August 1984 by Mizanur Rahman Bhuiyan, former lecturer of Notre Dame College and also the founder and chairman of Nature Study Society of Bangladesh.

Every year it organizes the most prestigious nature summit of the country. Its motto is 'Love the beauty of nature'.  Every year it publishes its annual magazine "Nisarga".

Notre Dame Science Club
Notre Dame Science Club also known as NDSC, is the oldest science club in the country. It was established on 18 September 1955 by the ex-principal of the college Father Richard William Timm, CSC. It celebrated its Golden Jubilee in 2005. And celebrated its 60 years in 2015. Every year it organizes the biggest science fair at college level in the country.

Its motto is 'Science In Human Welfare'. College's 3 quiz team "NDC Gold", "NDC Blue" and "NDC Green" are maintained by Notre Dame Science Club. Every year it publishes its annual magazine "Audri" and wall magazine "Abiskar(আবিষ্কার)", "Focus(ফোকাস)" & "Trimatrik(ত্রিমাত্রিক)". Moreover, Notre Dame Science Club also organizes different workshops and seminars which help its members to gather knowledge and improve their skills.

Notre Dame Rotaract Club
Notre Dame Rotaract Club (NDRC) is the first Rotaract club in the college level of Bangladesh. The club was founded in 1991 due to much eagerness and endeavor of Subrata Debnath, a student of academic year 1989-90 of Notre Dame College, Dhaka. Its objective is to form leadership quality, to build up notable personality, to make scopes of learning about the social, national and international situation, to give the chance of working together to enhance the spirit of cooperation.

Notre Dame Photography Club
Photography is an art, an art of trying your best to capture a frame that has been living inside your imaginations for an uncountable amount of time. With a view to helping the students flourish in this art form, Notre Dame Photography Club was established on 09 August 2017. Md. Moin Uddin Ahasan Habib, lecturer of Zoology of Biology Dept. is serving as the hon. moderator of this club.

Its motto is "Frame your dreams." Every year it hosts its annual photography event "Aperture" and has an annual magazine named "JPEG".

Notre Dame International Understanding and Relation Club
Notre Dame International Understanding and Relation Club (IURC) is one of the oldest International Relation Club of the country and the first International Relations Club in high school/college level. It was established on 20 February 1993. The club is renowned for hosting various international programs like Education Fair, BANMUN etc.

It also works along with International communities like American Center Dhaka, British Council etc. This club arranged the first ever Mock Model UN in Notre Dame College and also arranged the first Model UN of Notre Dame College titled Notre Dame College Model United Nations in 2017. The Second Session of NDCMUN took place from 11 to 13 January 2018 with more than 500 participants, making it one of the largest Model UNs in the country.

Notre Dame Math Club
Notre Dame Math Club was established on March 14, 2017 (Pi Day). The Club regularly organizes seminars, workshops, and tutorial classes for students interested in mathematics. It also helps weak students develop skills in mathematics.

Apart from regular programs, the club also organises the annual inter-school/inter-college program called the Notre Dame Math Festival. During this festival various mathematical competitions are held among school and college-level students from multiple institutions. The club annually publishes a handwritten scrap magazine called The Number  on Pi Day. On Pi Day 2018, the club published its first printed annual magazine called The Function.

Notre Dame Writer's Club
This club was founded in July 29, 2001. Motto of this club is 'অক্ষরে আঁকি সৃষ্টির সৌন্দর্য’ or 'Depicting the beauty of creation in letters'. Dr. Mizanur Rahman is the current moderator of this club. This club arranges workshops on creative writing, book publishing and journalism. Story writing, handwriting and quiz competitions are arranged regularly as well. Members of this club usually edit 'Dhak-Dhol Chit-Chat', the quarterly publication of Notre Dame College, Dhaka.

Juba Red Crescent Club, Notre Dame College
International Red Cross Red Crescent society is working in the world everywhere through volunteering since its opening. We Juba Red Crescent Club, Notre Dame college.

Notre Dame Abritti Dal
Mrs. Marlin Clara Baroi Madam is currently The Assistant Professor and Head of the Department of Bengali at Notre Dame College. She is also serving as The Hon. Moderator of  Notre Dame Abritti Dal.

Notre Dame Yoga and Meditation Club
Merging finitude into infinity with Mr. Swapan Halder Sir, lecturer of English, serving as the Hon. Moderator of Notre Dame Yoga and Meditation Club.

Notre Dame Media and Communication Club
Founded on 2022, Mrs. Shapla Banik Madam is serving as the Hon. Moderator of the club.

Publications
Blue and Gold is the yearbook of Notre Dame College. Notre Dame College publishes students' quarterly magazine Dhak Dhol - Chit Chat. Each club has its own yearly magazine/publication. Among them AUDRI of Notre Dame Science Club is the most famous. Nishorga, annual magazine of Notre Dame Nature Study Club is also worth mentioning.

Notre Dame International Understanding and Relation Club (NDIURC) also publishes its own annual magazine titled 'Jogajog' with couple thousand circulations. From last few years Notre Dame Natya Dal has been publishing Mancha, a magazine depicts its activities and about theater.

Notre Dame Math Club publishes a hand-designed scrap magazine called The Number, and the annual magazine called The Function on Pi Day. Notre Dame Information and Technology Club publishes their own magazine called Recursion which is given to the winners of various events of NIDTC's Annual Fest and its club members and well wishers.

Organization and administration
The college is managed by Christian priests of the Congregation of Holy Cross in Dhaka. Since its establishment, ten priests have served as the principal of the college.
John J. Harrington (1949 - 1954)
James L. Martin (1954 - 1960)
Theotonius Amal Ganguly (March 1960 - October 1960)
William Graham (1960 - 1967)
John Vanden Bossche (1967 - 1969)
Joseph S. Peixotto (1969 - 1970)
Richard Timm (1970 - 1971)
Ambrose Wheeler (1971 - 1976)
Joseph S. Peixotto (1976 - 1998)
Benjamin Costa (1998 - 2012)
Fr. Hemanto Pius Rozario (2012–present)

Among them, Father Timm was a renowned biologist and a winner of the 1987 Ramon Magsaysay award for International understanding. Father Timm was also the founder-moderator of Notre Dame Science Club and Notre Dame Debating Club.

Notable alumni

See also
Holy Cross College, Dhaka
List of colleges in Bangladesh
Education in Bangladesh

References

Further reading

External links 

Official website

 
Private colleges in Bangladesh
Colleges in Dhaka District
Universities and colleges in Dhaka
Holy Cross secondary schools
Catholic secondary schools in Bangladesh
Christianity in Dhaka
Congregations of Holy Cross
Educational institutions established in 1949
1949 establishments in East Pakistan